Joseph John Pender House is a historic plantation house located near Wilson, Wilson County, North Carolina.  The original section of the house was built about 1840 by Joseph John Pender, a large landowner and successful planter who was a member of a prominent landholding family.  The house consists of a two-story, three bay, Federal frame section and a one-story frame kitchen/dining room ell.  Also on the property are the contributing frame well structure and two tobacco barns.

It was listed on the National Register of Historic Places in 1986.

References

Plantation houses in North Carolina
Houses on the National Register of Historic Places in North Carolina
Federal architecture in North Carolina
Houses completed in 1840
Houses in Wilson County, North Carolina
National Register of Historic Places in Wilson County, North Carolina